Quinton Jamall Pointer (born April 16, 1988) is a former American football cornerback. In 2012, he was signed by the St. Louis Rams as an undrafted free agent. He played college football for Nevada-Las Vegas.

Early years
He attended Mariner High School in Cape Coral, Florida. He earned all-area and all-conference honors as a defensive back in 2005.

College career
He played college football for Nevada-Las Vegas. He finished college with 226 tackles, 2 sacks, 6 interceptions, 21 pass deflections and 5 forced fumbles.

In his freshman year, he finished the season with 50 tackles, 2 interceptions, 4 pass deflections and a forced fumble.

In his sophomore year, he finished the season with 44 tackles, 2 interceptions, 8 pass deflections.

In his junior year, he finished the season with 42 tackles, 2 sacks, 4 pass deflections and a forced fumble.

In His senior year, he finished the season with 59 tackles, 2 sacks, 5 pass deflections and 3 forced fumbles.

Professional career

St. Louis Rams
On May 8, 2012, he signed with the St. Louis Rams as an Undrafted free agent. On August 31, 2012, he made the 53 man roster. On September 14, 2012, he was released after making his NFL debut in Week 1, scoring two tackles. On September 18, 2012, he was signed to the team's practice squad.  On September 21, 2013, he was signed to the team's practice squad.

Tampa Bay Buccaneers
On May 30, 2014, he signed with the Tampa Bay Buccaneers. He was released the day before the season opener on September 6, 2014 to make room for undrafted rookie Solomon Patton.

Baltimore Ravens
On December 16, 2014, Pointer was signed by the Baltimore Ravens and was placed on the practice squad. On January 12, 2015, he signed a reserve/future contract with the Ravens. On September 4, 2015, he was waived by the Ravens.

Hamilton Tiger-Cats
On April 21, 2016, Pointer signed with the Hamilton Tiger-Cats of the Canadian Football League. In seven games, Pointer recorded 16 defensive tackles & 2 sacks. On August 26, 2016, Pointer was released by the Tiger-Cats.

Toronto Argonauts
On August 26, 2016, Pointer signed with the Toronto Argonauts of the Canadian Football League.

Baltimore Brigade
On March 17, 2017, Pointer was assigned to the Baltimore Brigade of the Arena Football League.

References

External links
UNLV Rebels bio
St. Louis Rams bio

1988 births
Living people
American football cornerbacks
Canadian football defensive backs
American players of Canadian football
UNLV Rebels football players
St. Louis Rams players
Tampa Bay Buccaneers players
Baltimore Ravens players
Hamilton Tiger-Cats players
Toronto Argonauts players
Baltimore Brigade players